Main Street Historic District is a national historic district located at Addison in Steuben County, New York. The district contains 26 contributing buildings.  The buildings are largely commercial in use, with apartments, offices, and / or storage space on the upper floors.

It was listed on the National Register of Historic Places in 1996.

References

Historic districts on the National Register of Historic Places in New York (state)
Italianate architecture in New York (state)
Historic districts in Steuben County, New York
National Register of Historic Places in Steuben County, New York